Engervannet is a lake between Blommenholm and Sandvika in the municipality of Bærum in Akershus county, Norway.

See also
List of lakes in Norway

Bærum
Lakes of Viken (county)